The 1982 Stanley Cup Finals was the championship series of the National Hockey League's (NHL) 1981–82 season, and the culmination of the 1982 Stanley Cup playoffs. It was played between the Campbell Conference champion Vancouver Canucks in their first Finals appearance and the Wales Conference and defending Cup champion New York Islanders, in their third Finals appearance. The Islanders won the best-of-seven series, four games to none, to win their third consecutive and overall Stanley Cup championship. This was the first time that a U.S.-based team won three straight Stanley Cups.

This would also be the first of nine consecutive Finals contested by a team from Western Canada, but it was the only one of them to feature the Vancouver Canucks; the other eight were contested by a team from Alberta (Edmonton Oilers appeared in six, Calgary Flames in two).

With the new "East vs. West" format in effect, the NHL opted to switch a 2-3-2 format for the Finals to reduce travel compared to the traditional 2–2–1–1–1 format, although that was of no effect for these Finals since the result was a four game sweep. Also, starting this season home-ice advantage would alternate between conferences as opposed to going to the team with the better record. The latter change would also be of no effect for these Finals since for even years the Wales champion received that advantage and in 1982 their representative, the Islanders, had the better record.

Paths to the Finals

Vancouver, despite having a losing record in the regular season, defeated the Calgary Flames 3–0, the Los Angeles Kings 4–1 and the Chicago Blackhawks 4–1 to advance to the finals. This was their first Finals appearance.

New York defeated the Pittsburgh Penguins 3–2, the New York Rangers 4–2, and the Quebec Nordiques 4–0 to make it to the finals for the third year in a row.

With New York having 118 points and Vancouver having 77, the 41-point difference between the two teams in a final round is the largest in Stanley Cup Finals history.

Game summaries
The Canucks had their best chance to win a game in the first one, as a Jim Nill short-handed marker gave them a 5–4 lead with only seven minutes to play in regulation time.  However, the Islanders tied it when Mike Bossy banged home a loose puck after goaltender Richard Brodeur had collided with his own defenceman, Harold Snepsts, while trying to smother it. In the dying seconds of the first overtime period, Snepsts attempted to clear the puck up the middle, but it was intercepted by Bossy, who completed his hat trick with two seconds left on the clock to win the game for the Islanders. In game two, the Canucks led 4–3 after two periods, but the Isles came back to win again.

The series then shifted to Vancouver, where the Canucks were boosted by a boisterous, towel-waving Vancouver crowd and had a great first period, but failed to score on Billy Smith, who was brilliant. The Islanders went on to win 3–0, and then completed the sweep with a 3–1 victory on May 16 to win their third straight Cup and first on the road.

New York Islanders vs. Vancouver Canucks

Mike Bossy won the Conn Smythe Trophy as playoff MVP.

Broadcasting
The series aired on CBC in Canada and on the USA Network in the United States. USA's national coverage was blacked out in the New York area due to the local rights to Islanders games in that TV market, with SportsChannel New York airing games one and two, and WOR televising games three and four.

Technical Difficulties
During the first period of the fourth game, WOR's broadcast experienced technical difficulties due to videotaping and editing issues causing an estimated 4 minutes and 30 seconds delay on their broadcast with a WOR identification card with text reading "Please Stand By" on the center of the screen. After a minute of silence, music by Alan Hawkshaw began playing with an announcer saying "Please stand by, we're experiencing technical difficulties. As soon as they have been corrected, we shall return to our scheduled programs". This occurred before a commercial break.

Team rosters

New York Islanders

|}

Vancouver Canucks

|}

Note: Stan Smyl served as the Canucks acting team captain during the 1982 Stanley Cup playoffs. Kevin McCarthy was injured late in the season and did not play in the playoffs and is listed as the official team captain.

Stanley Cup engraving
The 1982 Stanley Cup was presented to Islanders captain Denis Potvin by NHL President John Ziegler following the Islanders 3–1 win over the Canucks in game four

The following Islanders players and staff had their names engraved on the Stanley Cup

1981–82 New York Islanders

See also
 List of Stanley Cup champions
 1981–82 NHL season

Notes

References
 

 

 
Stanley
Stanley Cup Finals
New York Islanders games
Vancouver Canucks games
May 1982 sports events in North America
Ice hockey competitions in Vancouver
Ice hockey competitions in New York (state)
1982 in sports in New York (state)
1982 in British Columbia
1980s in Vancouver